The Uta Codex Quattuor Evangelia (Clm. 13601, Bavarian State Library, Munich) is a "gospel lectionary" or evangeliary. It contains those portions of the gospels which are read during church services. "Unlike most Gospel lectionaries, the individual readings in the Uta Codex are not arranged in calendrical order, but are instead grouped together after their respective Gospel authors." It was commissioned around 1025 by Abbess Uta von Niedermünster, Regensburg, in Bavaria, Germany. It is a spectacular Ottonian manuscript, and is famous for its gem-encrusted gold case, with a relief of Christ in Majesty, as well as for the eight full-page miniatures. German art historian George Swarzenski described the Uta Codex as "the wonderful gospel book, which is perhaps the most significant work of Western illumination of its time." The manuscript consists of 119 parchment sheets, 382 × 274 mm. Four full-page frontispieces illustrate 1) the Hand of God, 2) Abbess Uta dedicating the codex to the Virgin and Child, 3) the Crucifixion, and 4) Saint Erhard, patron saint of the convent, celebrating Mass. A portrait of each the four Evangelists accompanies the readings from their Gospel.

See also
 Ottonian art
 Niedermünster, Regensburg

Citations

Bibliography
 Cohen, Adam S. The Uta Codex: Art, Philosophy, and Reform in Eleventh-Century Germany, Penn State Press, 2000.
 Swarzenski, Georg. Die Regensburger Buchmalerei des X. und XI. Jahrhunderts, Verlag von Karl W. Hiersemann, 1901. (https://archive.org/details/dieregensburgerb00swar)

External links
 Uta Codex at Munich Digital Library
 The Hand of God; Four Virtues: http://daten.digitale-sammlungen.de/bsb00075075/image_6
 Madonna and Child; Abbess Uta: http://daten.digitale-sammlungen.de/bsb00075075/image_7
 The Crucifixion: http://daten.digitale-sammlungen.de/bsb00075075/image_10
 Saint Erhard Celebrating Mass: http://daten.digitale-sammlungen.de/bsb00075075/image_11
 Saint Matthew: http://daten.digitale-sammlungen.de/bsb00075075/image_14
 Saint Mark: http://daten.digitale-sammlungen.de/bsb00075075/image_86
 Saint Luke: http://daten.digitale-sammlungen.de/bsb00075075/image_122
 Saint John: http://daten.digitale-sammlungen.de/bsb00075075/image_182

Ottonian illuminated manuscripts
11th-century illuminated manuscripts
Christian iconography